Pierre Lamothe (born 18 September 1997) is a Canadian professional soccer player who plays as a midfielder for Pacific FC of the Canadian Premier League.

Early life
Pierre Lamothe was born in Greenfield Park, Quebec to a Canadian father and a Vietnamese mother from Huế. He began playing youth soccer at age four with local club CS Longueuil. In September 2011, he joined the Montreal Impact Academy, when it was founded. He played for Quebec provincial team at the U14 and U15 levels.

University career
In 2018, he began attending the Université de Montréal, where he played for the men's soccer team. In December 2018, he received a scholarship from the Foundation for Athlete Excellence. He won the U Sports men's soccer championship in 2018, finishing as runner-ups in 2019. In the 2019 final of the national championship, he was named player of the game, in their loss to the UQTR Patriotes. In 2018, he was named RSEQ Rookie of the Year and was named to the All-Rookie Team, as well as being named to the U Sports national All-Rookie Team. He was named an RSEQ First Team All-Star in both 2018 and 2019. He was named to the U Sports All-Tournament Team in 2019.

Club career
In July 2016, he joined the Impact's second team, FC Montreal in the USL, on an academy contract. After the season, he had a trial with the reserve side of French club FC Lorient.

In 2017, he returned to his former youth club CS Longueuil, joining the senior team in the Première ligue de soccer du Québec. In 2019, he was named team captain. During this time he also played club futsal with Longueuil and 2019 Canadian Futsal Championship finalists Sporting Montreal.

Ahead of the 2020 season, he sought to sign with a Canadian Premier League club, however, he ultimately joined fellow PLSQ side AS Blainville. He made only one appearance that season, which was cut short due to the COVID-19 pandemic, as he suffered an injury.

In January 2021, he joined HFX Wanderers FC in the Canadian Premier League on a one year contract, with a club option for 2022. Lamothe scored his first goal for the Wanderers on July 24, 2021 against Valour FC, netting the only goal in a 1-0 victory. In January 2022, HFX announced they had exercised Lamothe's contract option, keeping him with the side through the 2022 season. In August 2022, he scored two goals in back-to-back games, including a highlight reel goal on August 20 to give the Wanderers a 1-0 victory over Pacific FC. After two seasons with the team, he departed the club after the 2022 season. Over his two seasons with the club, he scored three goals and added two assists in 48 appearances, across all competitions.

In November 2022, he signed a contract with Pacific FC for the 2023 season. In January 2023, he trained with Vietnamese V.League 1 club SHB Da Nang, playing in the 2023 Thien Long Cup Friendly Tournament.

International career
In September 2015, Lamothe participated in a development camp for the Canadian U20 team led by Rob Gale.

In 2017, he was named to the Quebéc U20 team for the 2017 Jeux de la Francophonie.

Career statistics

References

External links

1997 births
Living people
Association football midfielders
Canadian soccer players
Soccer people from Quebec
Sportspeople from Longueuil
FC Montreal players
HFX Wanderers FC players
USL Championship players
Première ligue de soccer du Québec players
A.S. Blainville players
CS Longueuil players
Pacific FC players
Canadian Premier League players